A number of newspapers were produced by French prisoners in POW camps in Germany during World War I. Argus (1917) lists six such publications: Canard (Nürnberg), l'Écho des Baraques (Zwickau), Exilé (Hammelburg), Intermède (Würzburg), Le Camp de Göttingen (Göttingen) and Les Camps d'Allemagne (published from Göttingen, with news from Cassel camp as well).

References

World War I
French-language newspapers
French prisoners of war in World War I